Hilldale may refer to:

Hilldale, Lancashire, a village in West Lancashire, England
Hilldale, Missouri, United States
Hilldale, Pennsylvania, United States
Hilldale, Virginia, United States
Hilldale, West Virginia, United States
Hilldale Club, a Negro league baseball team based in Darby, Pennsylvania, United States
Hilldale Park, a former ballpark and home field of the Hilldale Club
Hilldale Public Schools, an independent school district in Muskogee, Oklahoma, United States
Hilldale railway station, on the North Coast line in New South Wales, Australia
Hilldale Shopping Center, a shopping center in Madison, Wisconsin, United States
a fictional neighborhood of the town of Hill Valley in the film trilogy Back to the Future

See also
Hildale, Utah